Marko Babić may refer to:
 Marko Babić (footballer) (born 1981), Croatian international footballer
 Marko Babić (soldier) (1965–2007), Croatian Army officer